Stumble.Stop.Repeat is the debut extended play by the  post-rock band 65daysofstatic, released on 1 December 2003 on Dustpunk Records. There has been much online debate as to the exact number of copies printed but it has been estimated to be as low as 200. It is long out of print and was near impossible to find. In 2019, the album was released digitally as part of a monthly supporter subscription, to promote the release of replicr, 2019.

Track listing
"Play.Nice.Kids" – 4:07
"Thrash Waltz" – 4:42
"AOD" – 6:28
"DNL.Mash-Up" – 4:28
"Ophelia.Remix" – 7:23

References

External links

65daysofstatic albums
2003 EPs